Haritalodes angustalis is a moth in the family Crambidae. It was described by Hiroshi Yamanaka in 2009. It is found in Kyushu, Japan.

References

Moths described in 2009
Spilomelinae